Leon Clifford Griffeth (May 20, 1925 – August 3, 2007) was an American Major League Baseball pitcher. Listed at 5' 11", 180 lb., he was a switch-hitter and threw left-handed.

Born in Carmel, New York, Griffeth pitched briefly for the Philadelphia Athletics during the 1946 season.

In a ten-game career, he posted a 2.93 earned run average with four strikeouts and six walks in 15⅓ innings of work, and did not have a decision. He also played eight minor league seasons from 1946 through 1953, posting a 44-52 record and a 4.15 ERA in 197 pitching appearances. 
 
Griffeth died in Durham, North Carolina, at the age of 82.

References

External links

Major League Baseball pitchers
Philadelphia Athletics players
Elmira Pioneers players
Lancaster Red Roses players
Mobile Bears players
Nashua Dodgers players
Savannah Indians players
St. Paul Saints (AA) players
Syracuse Chiefs players
Duke Blue Devils baseball players
Baseball players from New York (state)
1925 births
2007 deaths
People from Carmel, New York